Richard "Rich" Pzena (born January 8, 1959) is an American investment manager. He is the founder and chief investment officer of Pzena Investment Management, a New York-based deep value investment firm with $34.9 billion in assets under management.

Barron's has noted that Pzena "isn't afraid of taking risks," and "since Its founding in 1996, his Pzena Investment Management has pursued a deep-value, concentrated portfolio strategy that has sometimes led to volatile returns."

Personal life
Rich grew up in Livingston NJ, graduating from Livingston High School in 1976.  
He received a BS and an MBA from the Wharton School of Business in 1980.
Previously he worked as an oil industry analyst for Amoco production company in Chicago and New Orleans.
Prior to forming Pzena Investment Management he worked for Sanford C. Bernstein in New York, rising to the level of Chief Research Officer.
Pzena married Robin Buchalter on September 11, 2010 at the Wolffer Estates in Sagaponack, New York. Pzena has 4 children from a first marriage, and 2 step-children.

References

External links
 

1959 births
Living people
Businesspeople from New York City
20th-century American Jews
Wharton School of the University of Pennsylvania alumni
Chief investment officers
21st-century American Jews